Cannington Station is a railway station serving the suburb of Cannington south of Perth, Western Australia.

History
The original Cannington station was located between Station Street and Crawford Road in East Cannington, and was one of the original stations operational when the Armadale Line opened in 1889. As part of the electrification of the line in the early 1990s, the original Cannington station was replaced by a new station  to the north-west.

Future
As part of a Metronet project for several level crossing removals on the Armadale line, Cannington Station will be rebuilt as a new elevated station with island platforms, and a larger, 16 stand bus interchange underneath the station platforms. The new platforms will be the length of a six car train, as opposed to the current platforms which are the length of a four car train. The station platforms will be accessed by lift and stairs, with provisions for escalators and fare gates to be added in the future. The project will also replace the siding south-east of the station with a central double-ended turnback siding to allow the safe reversal of future six-car trains.

Services

Cannington station is served by Transperth Train Operations Armadale/Thornlie Line services.

The station saw 865,018 passengers in the 2013-14 financial year.

Platforms

Bus routes

References

External links

Gallery History of Western Australian Railways & Stations

Armadale and Thornlie lines
Railway stations in Perth, Western Australia
Railway stations in Australia opened in 1897
Cannington, Western Australia
Bus stations in Perth, Western Australia